Waterman-Grampse House is a historic home located at Nelliston in Montgomery County, New York.  It was built about 1865 and is a small, -story stone house of coursed rubble with cut-stone lintels and sills.  A frame house built in the 1960s is attached to the north side.

It was added to the National Register of Historic Places in 1980.

References

Houses on the National Register of Historic Places in New York (state)
Houses completed in 1865
Houses in Montgomery County, New York
National Register of Historic Places in Montgomery County, New York